Game Related is the second studio album by American rap group The Click, released November 7, 1995, on Jive and Sick Wid It Records. The album features production by Mike Mosley, Roger Troutman, Studio Ton and Tone Capone. It peaked at number 3 on the Billboard Top R&B/Hip-Hop Albums and at number 21 on the Billboard 200. Two singles were released, "Hurricane" and "Scandalous", and both appeared on multiple Billboard singles charts. The album features guest performances by Roger Troutman and Levitti, as well as one solo track for each member of the group.

Two music videos were produced to promote the album, one for "Hurricane" featuring a cameo appearance by Boots Riley of The Coup and another for "Scandalous" featuring Roger Troutman.

The album was certified gold by the Recording Industry Association of America (RIAA) on December 9, 1995.

The song "Hot Ones Echo Thru the Ghetto", was originally heard in the 1995 film, Tales from the Hood, and was also released on the film's soundtrack album.

Both "Hurricane" and "Scandalous" were later included on the 1999 compilation album, Sick Wid It's Greatest Hits.

Track listing
"Wolf Tickets" (featuring Kaveo and T-Pup)
"Hurricane"
"Out My Body"
"World Went Crazy" (E-40)
"Actin' Bad"
"Get Chopped"
"We Don't Fuck Wit Dat" (B-Legit)
"Be About Yo Paper" (featuring Levitti)
"Boss Baller" (D-Shot)
"Scandalous" (featuring Roger Troutman)
"Learn About It"
"If I Took Your Boyfriend" (Suga-T)
"Rock Up My Birdie"
"Hot Ones Echo Thru the Ghetto" (featuring Levitti)

Samples
Hurricane
"Poison" by Bell Biv DeVoe
If I Took Your Boyfriend
"If I Was Your Girlfriend" by Prince
Scandalous
"Computer Love" by Zapp
We Don't F*** Wit Dat
"Boyz-N-The-Hood" by Eazy-E

Charts

Weekly charts

Year-end charts

Singles

References

External links
 Game Related at Discogs
 Game Related at MusicBrainz
 Game Related at Tower Records
 "Hurricane" (single) at Discogs
 "Scandalous" (single) at Discogs

1995 albums
B-Legit albums
The Click albums
E-40 albums
Jive Records albums
Sick Wid It Records albums
Albums produced by Studio Ton